Crisp County High School is a public high school located in Cordele, Georgia, United States. The school is part of the Crisp County School District, which serves Crisp County.

Notable alumni
 Bernard Ford, former professional football player
 Andre Ramsey, former professional football player
 Tree Rollins, former professional basketball player
 Robert Tyler, professional baseball player
 Taylor Walls, professional baseball player
 Quay Walker, professional football player

References

External links 
 Crisp County School District
 Crisp County High School

Schools in Crisp County, Georgia
Public high schools in Georgia (U.S. state)